is the railway station in Tawara-machi, Sasebo, Nagasaki Prefecture.It is operated by Matsuura Railway and is on the Nishi-Kyūshū Line.

Lines
Matsuura Railway
Nishi-Kyūshū Line

Adjacent stations

Station layout
Kita-Sasebo Station has one ground level island platform serving two tracks.

Environs
National Route 204
Tawaramachi Shōtengai
Sakura-no-Seibo(The Holy Mother of the cherry tree) kindergarten (Ruins of Kami-Sasebo Station in Sasebo Railway)
Sasebo-Chuo High School
Seiwa Joshi Gakuin High School and Junior High School
Sasasbo-Kita High School and Junior High School
TSUTAYA

History
9 November 1935 - Opens for business as station of the Sasebo Line.
30 August 1943 - Sasebo Line Sasebo - Kita-Sasebo is incorporated into Matsuura Line and becomes the station of the Matsuura line.
1 April 1987 - Railways privatize and this station is inherited by JR Kyushu.
1 April 1988 - This station is inherited by Matsuura Railway .

References
Nagasaki statistical yearbook (Nagasaki prefectural office statistics section,Japanese)

External links

Matsuura Railway (Japanese)

Railway stations in Japan opened in 1935
Railway stations in Nagasaki Prefecture
Sasebo